Triakis is a genus of houndsharks in the family Triakidae. The name comes from the Greek word τρι, tri meaning "three", and the Latin word acis meaning "sharp" or "pointed", in reference to the three-pointed teeth of these sharks.

Species

See also

 List of prehistoric cartilaginous fish

References

 
Extant Paleocene first appearances